The NHL, or in full form the National Hockey League, is a professional ice hockey league in Canada and the United States.

NHL may also refer to:
NHL (video game series), ice hockey video game series
NHL Network (disambiguation), several television channels
NHL Stenden University of Applied Sciences, in the Netherlands
Nag Hammadi library, a collection of Gnostic texts
Nakasero Hospital, for-profit hospital in Kampala, Uganda
 National Harmonica League, now HarmonicaUK
National Heritage Life Insurance Company, based in the United States
National Historic Landmark, a place designation of the United States government
National Hurling League, based in Ireland 
Natural hydraulic lime, produced by heating limestone 
New Holland railway station, station code NHL in England
Non-Hodgkin lymphoma, a subgroup of cancers
Smt. NHL Municipal Medical College, in India
New Haven Line, a rail line in New York and Connecticut, United States